The Serranía del Perijá, Cordillera de Perijá or Sierra de Perijá  is a mountain range, an extension of the eastern Andean branch (Cordillera Oriental), in northern South America, between Colombia and Venezuela, ending further north in the Guajira Desert, a total distance of about . It separates the Maracaibo Basin from the Cesar-Ranchería Basin. Some of the area has been considered as a Flora and Fauna Sanctuary.

Geography 
Starting at the southernmost point, near Ocaña, Colombia, this mountain range forms the boundary between the Colombian departments of Norte de Santander and Cesar, and then as the range progresses north, it forms the international boundary between Venezuela (Zulia State) and Colombia (Cesar Department).  Included in the range are the Sierra Motilones, Sierra Valledupar, and Sierra Oca.  The highest point is Cerro de Las Tetas at 3630 meters, followed by Cerro Irapa at 3540 m., Serranía de Macuira at 864 m., and Cerro Aceite at 853 m.

Peoples 
The range is 58% in Venezuela, and 42% in Colombia.  Venezuela has set aside a substantial part of the central part of the range as a national park (Sierra de Perijá National Park), and Colombia has a smaller one.  In the Venezuelan portion there are Amerindian reservations for the Yucpa and Barí people, and in Colombia for the Iroko and Sokorpa people. Venezuela has started a colonialization border plan building new communities along the border in the Perijá. The town of Cojoro was the first one completed, followed by communities for the Wayuu and Goajira peoples.

Economy and politics 
The climate is mostly tropical humid forests, with cultivation of coffee and papaver flowers. It is also a hot spot in the Colombian Conflict serving as home to parts of two FARC blocs called the Caribbean Bloc of the FARC-EP and the Middle Magdalena Bloc of the FARC-EP., and an ELN guerrilla column, that have also strayed into Venezuelan territory.

References 

—Peakbagger.com: Perija-Guajira
 VHeadline.com Sunday, January 18, 1998, New border town ready in April as another gets lined up for flash point Perija, by Patrick J. O'Donoghue
 fac.mil.co,Accessed March 9, 2007, Colombian Air Force; "The New Corridors of Arms, Drugs and Death"

Mountain ranges of the Andes
Mountain ranges of Colombia
Mountain ranges of Venezuela
Geographical regions of Venezuela
Protected areas of Colombia